Rockabye is the third album by Robin Holcomb, released on September 8, 1992, through Elektra Records.

Track listing

Personnel 
Musicians
Art Baron – trombone on "Dixie" and "The Natural World"
Alan Bezozi – drums and percussion on "Help a Man" and "When Was the Last Time"
Mino Cinelu – percussion on "When I Stop Crying"
Stew Cutler – guitar
Danny Frankel – drums, tambourine on "When I Stop Crying", percussion on "Primavera"
Bill Frisell – guitar on "When Was the Last Time" and "The Goodnight-Loving Trail"
David Hofstra – bass guitar, tuba
Robin Holcomb – vocals, piano, Hammond organ on "Rockabye", keyboards on "When Was the Last Time"
Wayne Horvitz – Hammond organ, keyboards on "When Was the Last Time" and "Primavera", mixing, production
Guy Klucevsek – accordion on "Iowa Lands"
Bruce Kurnow – harmonica on "The Goodnight-Loving Trail"
Marty Ehrlich – tenor saxophone on "Dixie" and "The Natural World"
Peter Ostroushko – mandolin and "Rockabye", violin on "The Goodnight-Loving Trail"
The Steeles – backing vocals on "Help a Man", "When I Stop Crying" and "The Natural World"
Doug Wieselman – clarinet, tenor saxophone, guitar
Production and additional personnel
David Bither – production
Joe Ferla – engineering, mixing
Jay Folette – engineering
Dante Gioia – engineering
Bryce Goggin – engineering
Peter Holsapple – guitar on "Help a Man" and "When Was the Last Time", production
Mike Krowiak – engineering
Bob Ludwig – mastering
James MacMillan – engineering
Davey Payne – engineering
John Siket – engineering
Bob Smith – engineering
Tom Tucker, Jr. – engineering

References

External links 
 

1992 albums
Elektra Records albums
Robin Holcomb albums